Michael Hansson (born 22 January 1972) is a retired Swedish football midfielder.

References

1972 births
Living people
Swedish footballers
BK Olympic players
Trelleborgs FF players
Helsingborgs IF players
Association football midfielders
Sweden international footballers